The Dubai Polo Team is one of the most successful polo teams of all time, playing at the highest level globally. The Dubai Polo Team has bases in UK, Spain, USA, Argentina and Dubai.

The Dubai Polo Team have won the British Open for the Gold Cup and the Cartier Queens Cup many times. The Teams Patron Ali Albwardy, a successful business owner, also owns the Desert Palm Polo Club in Dubai. Adolfo Cambiaso is a regular player on the Dubai Polo Team alongside Ali and Ali’s sons Tariq and Rashid. Other prominent players to have been on the team include Lolo Castanola, Lucas Monteverde, Pablo Mac Donough and Piki Diaz Alberdi and more recently Bartolome Castagnola and Jeta Castagnola.

Ali Albwardy was also President of Ham Polo Club for eight years.

Wins
During the 2011 season Dubai reached the quarter final stages of both the Queen's and Gold Cups.

In 2010, the Team Consisting of Rashid Albwardy, Francisco Vismara, Matias MacDonough and Adolfo Cambiaso achieved Dubai's fourth win in the Queens Cup at Guards Polo Club. They also won the Gold Cup at Cowdray in this year.

In 2009, the team reached the Semi Finals of the Queens Cup and lost out in the final of the Gold Cup.

They have Had successes at 12 goal level in the Dubai Trophy at Ham Polo Club and they have been finalists in the Roehampton Trophy.

2012 season
Dubai Polo Team have confirmed that they will be entering the Queen's Cup and the Gold Cup for the British Open in 2012. The team will be:

1. Rashid Albwardy (2)
2. Alec White (2)
3. Ignacio Heguy (8)
4. Adolfo Cambiaso (10)

Dubai won the 2012 Cartier Queen's Cup against Ayalya with a score of 12–11, the final goal coming from a Cambiaso penalty in extra time in the final chukka.

2013 season
The 2013 Dubai team for the UK season consisted of:
1. Rashid Albwardy (2)
2. Nicolás Pieres (7)
3. Adolfo Cambiaso (10)
4. Alec White (3)

Dubai reached the Semi finals of the Queen's Cup at Guards and the final of the Gold Cup British Open at Cowdray Park in Sussex.

The team then played their first season in Sotogrande in Spain with the following line up:
1. Luis Domecq (2)
2. Martin Valent (5)
3. Adolfo Cambiaso (10)
4. Patricio Cieza (5)

References

Dubai
Sports organisations of England
Windsor, Berkshire